Faking the Books is the third studio album by German electronic music band Lali Puna. It was released on 5 April 2004 by Morr Music.

Faking the Books peaked at number 23 on Billboards Top Dance/Electronic Albums chart.

Critical reception

At Metacritic, which assigns a weighted average score out of 100 to reviews from mainstream critics, Faking the Books received an average score of 83 based on 18 reviews, indicating "universal acclaim".

Faking the Books was ranked at number five on Exclaim!s "Electronic – Year in Review 2004" list.

Track listing

Personnel
Credits are adapted from the album's liner notes.

Lali Puna
 Valerie Trebeljahr
 Markus Acher
 Christoph Brandner
 Christian Heiß

Additional musicians
 Sebastian Hess – cello on "Crawling by Numbers"
 Osamu Nambu – violin on "Alienation"
 Max Punktezahl – guitar on "Left Handed"

Production
 Chris Blair – mastering
 Mario Thaler – production, mixing, recording

Design
 Jan Kruse – cover artwork
 John-Patrick Morarescu – photography

Charts

References

Further reading

External links
 

2004 albums
Lali Puna albums
Morr Music albums